Precision Shooting Club Andorra (PSCA), Andorran Club Andorrà de Tir de Precisió (CATP), is the Andorran association for practical shooting under the International Practical Shooting Confederation.

External links 
 Official homepage of Precision Shooting Club Andorra

References 

Regions of the International Practical Shooting Confederation
Sports organisations of Andorra